The Battle of Cape Henry was a naval battle in the American War of Independence which took place near the mouth of Chesapeake Bay on 16 March 1781 between a British squadron led by Vice Admiral Mariot Arbuthnot and a French fleet under Admiral Charles René Dominique Sochet, Chevalier Destouches.  Destouches, based in Newport, Rhode Island, had sailed for the Chesapeake as part of a joint operation with the Continental Army to oppose the British army of Brigadier General Benedict Arnold that was active in Virginia.

Destouches was asked by General George Washington to take his fleet to the Chesapeake to support military operations against Arnold by the Marquis de Lafayette.  Sailing on 8 March, he was followed two days later by Admiral Arbuthnot, who sailed from eastern Long Island.  Arbuthnot's fleet outsailed that of Destouches, reaching the Virginia Capes just ahead of Destouches on 16 March.  After manoeuvring for several hours, the battle was joined, and both fleets suffered some damage and casualties without losing any ships. However, Arbuthnot was positioned to enter the Chesapeake as the fleets disengaged, frustrating Destouches' objective.  Destouches returned to Newport, while Arbuthnot protected the bay for the arrival of additional land troops to reinforce General Arnold.

Background

In December 1780, British General Sir Henry Clinton sent Brigadier General Benedict Arnold (who had changed sides to the British the previous September) with about 1,700 troops to Virginia to do some raiding and to fortify Portsmouth. General George Washington responded by sending the Marquis de Lafayette south with a small army to oppose Arnold. Seeking to trap Arnold between Lafayette's army and a French naval detachment, Washington asked the French admiral Destouches, the commander of the fleet at Newport, Rhode Island for help.  Destouches was wary of the threat posed by the slightly larger British North American fleet anchored at Gardiner's Bay off the eastern end of Long Island, and was reluctant to help.

A storm in early February damaged some of Arbuthnot's fleet, which prompted Destouches to send a squadron of three ships south shortly after. When they reached the Chesapeake, the British ships supporting Arnold moved up the shallow Elizabeth River, where the French ships were unable to follow. This modest success, and the encouragement of General Washington, prompted Destouches to embark on a full-scale operation. On 8 March, Washington was in Newport when Destouches sailed with his entire fleet, carrying 1,200 troops for use in land operations when they arrived in the Chesapeake.

Vice-admiral of the White Mariot Arbuthnot, the British fleet commander in North America, was aware that Destouches was planning something, but did not learn of Destouches' sailing until 10 March, and immediately led his fleet out of Gardiner Bay in pursuit.  He had the speed advantage of copper-clad vessels and a favourable wind, and reached Cape Henry on 16 March, slightly ahead of Destouches.

Battle
Although the two fleets both had eight ships in their lines, the British had an advantage in firepower: the 90-gun  was the largest ship of either fleet (compared to the 80-gun Duc de Bourgogne), while the French fleet also included the recently captured 44-gun Romulus, the smallest vessel on either line. Arbuthnot came about, and Destouches ordered his ships to form a line of battle heading west, with the wind. Between 8 and 9 am the winds began shifting, but visibility remained poor, and the two fleets manoeuvred for several hours, each seeking the advantage of the weather gage. From 0815, he French were sailing close-hauled and had the weather gage, and around 0930, Destouches ordered to wear ship in sequence. As they executed the order, the topsail yards of Ardent and Éveillé broke, slowing and disorganising the Destouches' battle line, and the British seized the opportunity to close in. Destouches ordered another turn, further closing to the British, but allowing Ardent and Éveillé to repair and return to their stations, which they did by 1100. 

By 1 pm the wind had stabilised from the northeast, and Arbuthnot was coming up on the rear of the French line as both headed east-southeast, tacking against the wind.  Destouches ordered to wear ship in sequence again, and brought his line around in front of the advancing British line.  With this manoeuvre he surrendered the weather gage (giving Arbuthnot the advantage in determining the attack), but it also positioned his ships relative to the wind such that he could open his lower gundecks in the heavy seas, which the British could not do without the risk of water washing onto the lower decks.

Arbuthnot responded to the French manoeuvre by ordering his fleet to wear.  When the ships in the van of his line made the maneuver, they were fully exposed to the French line's fire, and consequently suffered significant damage. At 1330, the vanguards of both squadron engaged, the French Crossing the T of the three first British ships. Robust, Europe, and Prudent were virtually unmanageable due to damage to their sails and rigging.  Arbuthnot kept the signal for maintaining the line flying, and the British fleet thus lined up behind the damaged vessels.

As Conquérant closed in to Robust, a cannonball struck her wheel, killed four helmsmen and sending her Into the wind. the 74-gun Royal Oak and the 100-gun London closed within pistol range, but a lucky shot from Conquérant took off London topsail yard, forcing her to stop. Conquérant remained exposed for another 30 minutes before she managed to establish a jury rigging and return to the French battle line.

After one hour, Destouches at this point again ordered his fleet to wear in succession, and his ships raked the damaged British ships once more before pulling away to the east. The British ships were too damaged to pursue.

Aftermath
French casualties were 72 killed and 112 wounded, while the British suffered 30 killed and 73 wounded.   Arbuthnot pulled into Chesapeake Bay, thus frustrating the original intent of Destouches' mission, while the French fleet returned to Newport. After transports delivered 2,000 men to reinforce Arnold, Arbuthnot returned to New York.  He resigned his post as station chief due to age and infirmity in July and left for England, ending a stormy, difficult, and unproductive relationship with General Clinton.

On 17 March, Destouches held a war council, which concluded that the ships were too damaged to resume combat, and decided to call Newport to repair.

The United States Congress voted officials thanks to Destouches. General Washington, unhappy that the operation had failed, wrote a letter that was mildly critical of Destouches.  This letter was intercepted and published in an English newspaper, prompting a critical response to Washington by the Comte de Rochambeau, the French army commander at Newport. The Comte de Barras, who arrived in May to take command of the Newport station, justified Destouches' decision not to pursue the attack: "It is a principle in war that one should risk much to defend one's positions, and very little to attack those of the enemy."  Naval historian Alfred Thayer Mahan points out that "this aversion from risks [...] goes far to explain the French want of success in the war."

Lafayette, when he learned of the French failure, turned back north to rejoin Washington.  Washington then ordered Lafayette to stay in Virginia, having learned of the reinforcements sent to Arnold. Although the French operation to support Lafayette was unsuccessful, the later naval operations by the Comte de Grasse that culminated in the French naval victory in the September 1781 Battle of the Chesapeake paved the way for a successful naval blockade and land siege of Lord Cornwallis' army at Yorktown, Virginia.

Order of battle

Other ships
 Guadelupe (frigate, 28, Hugh Robinson)
 Pearl (frigate, 32, George Montagu)
 Iris (frigate, 32, George Dawson)
 Medea (frigate, 28, Henry Duncan)

Other ships
 Hermione (frigate, 36, Latouche)
 Gentille (frigate, 32, Mengaud de la Haye)
 Fantasque (14, M. de Vaudoré)
 Surveillante (frigate, 32, Jean-Marie de Villeneuve Cillart)

Legacy
The battle has been memorialized by American singer-songwriter Todd Snider in "The Ballad of Cape Henry" on his 2008 album Peace Queer:

Cape Henry, Cape Henry, the battlefield's on fire
White water, white water, with those flames climbing higher
We fired our cannon at least two hours or more
Cape Henry, Cape Henry off of that old Virginia shore

Although there is a marker commemorating the Battle of the Chesapeake at the Cape Henry Memorial in Virginia, there is no recognition of this battle at the site.

Notes, citations, and references
Notes

Citations

Bibliography
 
 
 
 
 
 
 
 
 
 
 
 
 
 
 
 
 
 

 External links
 
 

1781 in the United States
Conflicts in 1781
Cape Henry
Cape Henry
Cape Henry
1781 in Virginia
Cape Henry
Cape Henry